Isolate and Medicate (stylised as isolate and medicate) is the sixth studio album by South African rock band Seether. It was released on 1 July 2014 by The Bicycle Music Company, in association with Concord Music Group and Spinefarm Records. It is the first Seether album to be released on a vinyl LP.

Release and promotion
On 1 May 2014, the band released the first single from the album, "Words as Weapons". "Same Damn Life" was released on 16 September 2014 as the album's second single. "Nobody Praying for Me" was sent to US Active Rock stations on 28 April 2015 as the third single off of the album. "Save Today" was sent to US Active Rock stations on 22 September 2015 as the fourth single off of the album.

Critical reception

Loudwire wrote "the group offers one of their finest albums to date by digging deep and expressing themselves in a variety of ways". AllMusic said "Seether gravitate toward the melodic, a shift apparent in both the verses and the riffs, although there's still a tendency to grind out thick neo-grunge guitar workouts both slow ("My Disaster") and fast ("Suffer It All")". Blabbermouth.net wrote "Isolate and Medicate shows Seether trying to roll after more than a decade and a half in the life, but it presents a case of identity crisis, since it's apparent these guys are capable of writing pretty kickass stuff if left to their own devices."

Track listing

Mastered by Ted Jensen at Sterling Sound, New York City

Charts

Year-end charts

Certifications

Release history

Personnel
Credits adapted from the album's liner notes.

Seether
 Shaun Morgan – lead vocals, guitar
 Dale Stewart – bass, backing vocals
 John Humphrey – drums, percussion

Production
 Brendan O'Brien — producer, mixing
 Tom Syrowski — engineer
 Miguel Lara — second engineer
 Billy Joe Bowers — mastering

References

External links
Album website
iTunes

Seether albums
2014 albums